General Briggs may refer to:

Charles James Briggs (1865–1941), British Army lieutenant general
Harold Douglas Briggs (1877–1944), Royal Air Force brigadier general
Harold Rawdon Briggs (1894–1952), British Indian Army lieutenant general
Henry Shaw Briggs (1824–1887), Union Army brigadier general
James E. Briggs (1906–1979), U.S. Air Force lieutenant general
John Briggs (East India Company officer) (1785–1875), British East India Company general
Raymond Briggs (British Army officer) (1895–1985), British Army major general
Raymond Westcott Briggs (1878–1959), U.S. Army officer brigadier general